The second season of the Sailor Moon anime series Sailor Moon R (originally released in Japan as , and later as Pretty Guardian Sailor Moon R), was produced by Toei Animation and directed by Junichi Sato and Kunihiko Ikuhara. According to the booklet from the Sailor Moon Memorial Song Box, the letter "R" stands for the word "Romance", "Return" or "Rose".

Like the rest of the series, it follows the adventures of Usagi Tsukino and her fellow Sailor Guardians. The first 13 episodes consist of the "Makai Tree" arc, while the following 29 episodes consist of the "Black Moon Clan" arc which adapts the fourth through seventh volumes of the Sailor Moon manga series by Naoko Takeuchi. After defeating the Dark Kingdom, the Sailor Guardians are living normal lives, but their memories and powers are then restored after the arrival of the Hell Tree aliens, who are harvesting energy from people and challenge the Sailor Guardians. Afterwards, the Black Moon Clan have travelled from the future to the present and start planning an operation to steal energy at the Star Points of the future Crystal Tokyo, forcing the Sailor Guardians to confront them with her daughter from the future, Chibiusa.

This season makes use of two pieces of theme music: one opening theme and one ending theme. The opening theme, titled , is performed by the idol group DALI. The ending theme  is performed by Yoko Ishida. DIC Entertainment used an English-language version of the Japanese opening theme as both the opening and ending theme.

The season aired from March 6, 1993 to March 12, 1994 on TV Asahi in Japan. In the 1994 "favorite episode" polls for Animage, "Protect Chibiusa! Clash of the 10 Warriors" came in eighth place. The following year, "The Final Battle Between Light and Darkness! Love Sworn to the Future" came in seventh place.

The season was licensed and heavily edited for a dubbed broadcast and VHS/DVD release in English by DIC Entertainment. It was the last season to be dubbed by DIC. The first 25 episodes of their adaptation were aired on the Canadian channel YTV from October 25 to November 28, 1995. Eventually, the remaining 17 episodes aired from October 4 to November 21, 1997, omitting only one of the season's 43 episodes. A year later, General Mills-sponsored The Program Exchange syndicated those episodes as "The Lost Episodes" on Cartoon Network's programming block Toonami. Starting with the third season, Cloverway Inc. took over dubbing new episodes for broadcast on Cartoon Network. Later, ADV Films re-released the series in an uncut, albeit subtitle-only, DVD box set, which also omitted episode 67 from the release. Afterward, in 2014, Viz Media began redubbing the series from the start for an uncut release, and released R in two DVD/Blu-ray boxsets on July 14 and October 27, 2015.

In 1993, Bandai published Bishoujo Senshi Sailor Moon R for Super Nintendo Entertainment System. In 1994, Angel, a subsidiary company of Bandai, developed and published Bishoujo Senshi Sailor Moon R for Game Boy.

Episode list (1993–1994)

Home media

Japanese

VHS

DVD

Blu-ray

English

VHS

United States

DVD

United States

United Kingdom

Australia and New Zealand

Blu-ray + DVD combo

United States

Australia and New Zealand

Film 

The film debuted in Japanese theaters on December 5, 1993 and Pioneer Entertainment released it in the United States on February 8, 2000. On January 13, 2017, Viz Media re-released the movie re-dubbed and uncut for the first time in American theaters, simply titled Sailor Moon R: The Movie.

The events portrayed in this film seem to take place somewhere in the very end of the series, as Chibiusa knows about the identities of the Sailor Guardians, the characters are in the present rather than the future, and Mamoru and Usagi are back together. The film centers on the arrival of an alien named Fiore on Earth, who has a past with Mamoru and wishes to reunite with him. Unfortunately, Fiore is being controlled by an evil flower called Xenian Flower, forcing Usagi and her friends to save Mamoru and the Earth from destruction.

Japanese theaters featured a 15-minute short recap episode before the film titled . The re-dub also included the English dubbed short.

References

External links 

1993 Japanese television seasons
1994 Japanese television seasons
Sailor Moon seasons
Anime and manga about time travel